Jerrell Jackson (born February 6, 1990) is an American football wide receiver for the Winnipeg Blue Bombers of the Canadian Football League. He was signed by the Houston Texans as an undrafted free agent in 2012. He played college football at Missouri.

College career
He played college football at Missouri from 2008 to 2011.

Professional career

Houston Texans
Jackson signed with the Houston Texans on April 29, 2012, after he was not drafted during the 2012 NFL Draft.

Jacksonville Jaguars
Jackson was signed to the Jacksonville Jaguars practice squad on December 14, 2012. He was promoted to the active roster on December 24. He was released on April 29, 2013.

Chicago Bears
Jackson signed with the Chicago Bears on June 10, 2013. Jackson was waived on August 18.

Kansas City Chiefs
Jackson signed with the Kansas City Chiefs during the 2014 offseason, but was released by the team on August 25, 2014.

Winnipeg Blue Bombers
Jackson was signed by the Winnipeg Blue Bombers on October 16, 2014.

References

External links
Winnipeg Blue Bombers bio 
Missouri Tigers bio
Houston Texans bio
Jacksonville Jaguars bio

1990 births
Living people
Players of American football from Houston
Players of Canadian football from Houston
University of Missouri alumni
Missouri Tigers football players
American football wide receivers
Houston Texans players
Jacksonville Jaguars players
Winnipeg Blue Bombers players
People from Marengo, Illinois